Irman is a village in Lorestan Province, Iran.

Irman also may refer to:

Places
Irin, Iran, a village in Tehran Province, Iran, also known as Irman

People
Neli Irman (b. 1986), Slovenian handball player
Regina Irman (b. 1957), Swiss musician, music educator, and composer
Irman Gusman (b. 1962), Indonesian politician and businessman